Eating is a 1990 American comedy-drama film starring Nelly Alard, Lisa Blake Richards, Frances Bergen, Mary Crosby, Gwen Welles, Elizabeth Kemp, Marina Gregory and written and directed by Henry Jaglom.

Plot
Featuring an all-female cast, the film is set entirely inside and around a spacious house in Los Angeles. Helene is a woman turning 40 years old and her friends—who include French filmmaker Martine, house guest Sophie, and Lydia—throw her a party. But also there is Kate, a friend turning 30, and Sadie, a Hollywood film agent turning 50. So, all of Helene's, Kate's, and Sadie's friends arrive for the triple-birthday party where Martine films the events with her movie camera, as well as filming the shocking secrets revealed by Helene's mother Whitney and younger sister Nancy who confide in their interviews about their obsession with food and their roles in life.

Cast

Nelly Alard as Martine
Lisa Blake Richards as Helene (credited as Lisa Richards)
Frances Bergen as Whitney
Mary Crosby as Kate
Gwen Welles as Sophie
Elizabeth Kemp as Nancy
Marina Gregory as Lydia
Daphna Kastner as Jennifer
Marlena Giovi as Sadie
Beth Grant as Carla
Taryn Power as Anita
Catherine Genender as Lily
Hildy Brooks as Mary
Jackie O'Brien as Janet (credited as Jacqueline Woolsey)
Sherry Boucher as Maria (credited as Sherry Boucher-Lytle)
Savannah Smith Boucher as Eloise
Aloma Ichinose as Joanna
Toni Basil as Jackie

Sources

http://rogerebert.suntimes.com/apps/pbcs.dll/article?AID=/19910621/REVIEWS/106210303/1023
https://www.washingtonpost.com/wp-srv/style/longterm/movies/videos/eatingnrkempley_a0a162.htm
https://www.variety.com/profiles/Film/main/125023/Eating.html?dataSet=1

1990 films
1990 comedy-drama films
American comedy-drama films
Films featuring an all-female cast
1990s English-language films
Films directed by Henry Jaglom
1990s American films
English-language comedy-drama films